Dangerous Minds: Music from the Motion Picture is the official soundtrack to the 1995 film Dangerous Minds. The album was released in 1995 on MCA Records.

The soundtrack topped the Billboard 200 chart in 1995. By December 1995, it was certified triple platinum by the RIAA, for shipments exceeding 3,000,000 copies in the United States.

Release and reception
The album reached number one on the U.S. Billboard 200 and reached the second spot on the R&B albums chart. The album was certified platinum in September 1995 and triple platinum by December of the same year.

Stephen Thomas Erlewine of Allmusic called the soundtrack "an expertly-crafted urban R&B/hip-hop collection, featuring stellar production and songwriting from a number of the best and most popular artists of 1995."

Track listing

Personnel
Information taken from Allmusic.
composing – Berry Gordy Jr., Frank Hudson, Alphonso Mizell, Deke Richards, Danger Jay
executive production – Jerry Bruckheimer, DeVante Swing, Don Simpson
lyricist(s) – Aaron Hall
mastering – Herb Powers
music supervisor – Kathy Nelson
performer(s) – 24K, Big Mike, Tre Black, Coolio, Craig Mack, DeVante Swing, Aaron Hall, Immature, L.V., Danger Jay, Rappin' 4-Tay, Sista, Static, Wendy & Lisa
production – Bass Mechanics, Claudio Cueni, Dalvin DeGrate, Cyrus Esteban, Evil Dee, Danger Jay, Trevor Horn, Pimp C, Michael J. Powell, Doug Rasheed, Chris Stokes, Timbaland
soundtrack coordination – Lesley Allery, Kevin Breen, Christine Edwards, Bill Green, Todd Homme, Sylvia Krask

Charts

Weekly charts

Year-end charts

Singles

Certifications and sales

See also
 Number-one albums of 1995 (U.S.)

Notes

External links
 
 Dangerous Minds at Discogs

1995 soundtrack albums
Albums produced by Timbaland
Drama film soundtracks
Gangsta rap soundtracks
Hip hop soundtracks
MCA Records soundtracks
Contemporary R&B soundtracks
Funk soundtracks
Soul soundtracks